Mehrdad Kia is Professor of History and Director of Central and Southwest Asian Studies at the University of Montana. He focusses on the history of the Middle East, Central Asia, North Africa and on the civilizational history of Islam. He received his PhD in 1986 from the University of Wisconsin-Madison. Kia also holds interests in the intellectual history of 19th-century and early 20th-century Iran, the Ottoman Empire and the South Caucasus.

Kia was born and raised in Iran and moved to the United States aged 17.

References

University of Montana faculty
University of Wisconsin–Madison alumni
Living people
Middle Eastern studies scholars
Central Asian studies scholars
Intellectual historians
Iranian emigrants to the United States
20th-century American historians
21st-century American historians
20th-century Iranian historians
21st-century Iranian historians
Year of birth missing (living people)